Frederic Atwood Besley FACS (18681944) was an American military medical doctor and surgeon during the during the World War I. He founded the American College of Surgeons, Surgery Gynecology and Obstetrics and founding member of the American Board of Surgery.

Background 
Besley was born at Waukegan, Illinois, his parent are William Besley (father) and (mother) Sylvia Jocelyn.

He attended Chicago Manual Training School in 1880 and graduated from the Northwestern University Medical School in 1894 together with a colleague Franklin H. Martin.

Medical career 
Besley started with internship at Cook County Hospital and began his practice in Chicago with specializing in surgery. From 1900 to 1908 he began to work in the Postgraduate Medical School together in the Northwestern Medical School and in 1901 to 1902 he worked as a professor of surgery in the Women's Medical College of Northwestern University. He later became an instructor of surgery in 1904 at the Northwestern University and finally became an advanced professor of surgery, serving as an staff member and consult of various hospitals in Chicago.

American College of Surgery and Surgery, Gynecology and Obstetrics 
He worked with Franklin Martin together they founded and editors of the  journal Surgery, Gynecology and Obstetrics in 1905. Besley was the founder of American Board of Surgery and American College of Surgeons serving various positions in the board and the college of surgery.

He also chaired the American College of Surgeons in 1937 to 1938 as well as Secretary of American Board of Surgery in 1938 and was a founding member of the Industrial Medicine and Traumatic Surgery of the committee of American College of Surgery.

Army medical career 
Besley served in the army as a medical reserves firstly commissioned as major in the US Armed forces during the World War I with the British and in the America were he works as a chief surgeon of Northwestern University Base Hospital in France, he was a member of the Executive Committee of the General Medical Board for President Wilson's Council of National Defense and had also held key positions in the Association of Military Surgeons and Surgical Societies in Army, he retired as a colonel.

Personal life 
He married Myria Busey in 1910 to his death 1944.

Citations

References

Further reading 

 An appreciation of Frederic Atwood Besley"' April 19, 1868- August 16, 1944
 Memorial page for Dr Frederic A. Besley (19 Apr 1868–16 Aug 1944), Find a Grave Memorial no. 116263123, citing Northshore Garden of Memories, North Chicago, Lake County, Illinois, USA ; Maintained by North Shore Gal (contributor 47779479), Find a Grave database, accessed 20 September 2020),
 Obituaries The Military Surgeon. Volume 95, Issue 4, October 1944, Pages 339–341. Published: 1 October 1944

1868 births
1944 deaths
American physicians
Northwestern University alumni
People from Waukegan, Illinois
Military personnel from Illinois
Physicians from Illinois
American surgeons
United States Army doctrine